The Wiz is a 1978 American musical adventure fantasy film directed by Sidney Lumet. A reimagining of L. Frank Baum's classic 1900 children's novel The Wonderful Wizard of Oz featuring an all African-American cast, the film was adapted from the 1974 Broadway musical of the same title. It follows the adventures of Dorothy, a shy, twenty-four year old Harlem schoolteacher who finds herself magically transported to the urban fantasy Land of Oz, which resembles a dream version of New York City. Befriended by a Scarecrow, a Tin Man and a Cowardly Lion, she travels through the city to seek an audience with the mysterious Wiz, who they say is the only one powerful enough to send her home.

Produced by Universal Pictures and Motown Productions, filming took place in Queens, New York from October to December 1977, with a cast starring Diana Ross, Michael Jackson (in his feature film debut), Nipsey Russell, Ted Ross, Mabel King, Theresa Merritt, Thelma Carpenter, Lena Horne and Richard Pryor. Its story was reworked from William F. Brown's Broadway libretto by Joel Schumacher, and Quincy Jones supervised the adaptation of Charlie Smalls and Luther Vandross' songs for it. A handful of new songs, written by Jones and the songwriting team of Nickolas Ashford & Valerie Simpson, were added for the project.

The Wiz was theatrically released on October 24, 1978 to critical and commercial failure, marking the end of the resurgence of African-American films that began with the blaxploitation movement of the early 1970s. The film received generally negative reviews from critics, with many unfavorably comparing the film to its source material, and criticizing the casting of Diana Ross as Dorothy. Despite its initial failure, it became a cult classic among audiences, Jackson's fanbase and Oz enthusiasts. It also received four Oscar nominations at the 51st Academy Awards (Best Score, Best Cinematography, Best Art Direction, Best Costume Design). 

Certain aspects influenced The Wiz Live!, a live television adaptation of the musical, aired on NBC in 2015.

Plot
A crowded Thanksgiving dinner brings a host of family together in a small Brooklyn apartment, where shy, twenty-four-year-old elementary schoolteacher Dorothy Gale lives with her Aunt Em and Uncle Henry ("The Feeling That We Once Had"). Extremely introverted, she is teased by Aunt Em for having delayed moving out to start her life as an adult ("Can I Go On?"). While Dorothy cleans up after the meal, her dog Toto runs out the open kitchen door into a snowstorm. She succeeds in retrieving him but finds herself trapped in the storm. A magical whirlwind made of snow materializes and transports them to the realm of Oz, depicted as a dystopian version of New York City.

As Dorothy descends from the atmosphere she smashes through an electric "Oz" sign, which falls upon and kills Evermean, the Wicked Witch of the East who rules Munchkinland. As a result, she frees the Munchkins who populate the playground into which she lands. Dorothy soon meets the Munchkins' main benefactress, Miss One, the Good Witch of the North, a magical "numbers runner" who gives her Evermean's charmed silver slippers. Dorothy declares she just wants to get home to Aunt Em. Miss One urges her to follow the yellow brick road to the Emerald City and seek the help of the powerful "Wiz" ("He's the Wiz"). After telling her never to take the silver shoes off, Miss One and the Munchkins disappear and Dorothy is left to search for the road on her own ("Soon As I Get Home").

The next morning, Dorothy happens upon mysterious and a scarecrow made of garbage and saves him from being teased by a group of humanoid crows ("You Can't Win"). The Scarecrow hopes the Wiz might be able to give him the one thing he feels that he lacks: a brain. They discover the yellow brick road and begin to "Ease on Down the Road". Along the way, they meet the Tin Man in an abandoned amusement park ("If I Could Feel"/"Slide Some Oil to Me") and a Cowardly Lion, banished from the jungle ("I'm a Mean Ol' Lion"). The Tin Man and Lion join them on their quest to find the Wiz, hoping to gain a heart and courage, respectively. En route to the Emerald City, the adventurers escape from a haunted subway station and a group of flamboyant prostitutes known as the "Poppy Girls", who seduce the Lion. The Lion feels deeply ashamed of leading Dorothy into a trap, but she and the rest of the gang cheer him up ("Be a Lion").

Finally reaching the Emerald City, the four friends are granted an audience with the Wiz, who appears to them as a giant fire-breathing metallic head. He will only grant their wishes if they kill the sister of the Wicked Witch of the East, Evillene, the Wicked Witch of the West, who runs a sweatshop in the underground sewers of Oz. Before they can reach her domain, Evillene learns of their quest to kill her and sends out the Flying Monkeys to capture them ("Don't Nobody Bring Me No Bad News").

Vengeful for Dorothy having killed her sister, she dismembers the Scarecrow, flattens the Tin Man, and hangs the Lion up by his tail in hopes of making Dorothy give her the silver shoes. When she threatens to throw Toto into a fiery cauldron, Dorothy nearly gives in until the Scarecrow hints to her to activate a fire sprinkler switch. The sprinklers put out the fire and melt Evillene. With Evillene dead, her spells lose their power, resulting in the freedom of all her sweat shop workers and prisoners ("A Brand New Day").

The Flying Monkeys give Dorothy and her friends a triumphant ride back to the Emerald City, where they discover that the Wiz is actually Herman Smith, a failed politician from Atlantic City. The Scarecrow, Tin Man, and Lion are distraught that they will never receive their brain, heart, and courage, but Dorothy makes them realize that they already have had these things all along ("Believe in Yourself") even as she fears she will never find her own way home. Glinda appears and implores her to use the magic of the silver slippers ("Believe in Yourself (Reprise)"). After thanking Glinda and saying goodbye to her friends, she reminisces about "Home". She clicks her heels together three times and discovers she is back near home with Toto in her arms.

Cast

Music

All songs written by Charlie Smalls, unless otherwise noted.

Production

Pre-production and development
The Wiz was the eighth feature film produced by Motown Productions, the film/television division of Berry Gordy's Motown Records label. Gordy originally wanted the teenaged future R&B singer Stephanie Mills, who had originated the role on Broadway, to be cast as Dorothy. When Motown star Diana Ross asked Gordy if she could be cast as Dorothy, he declined, saying that Ross—then 33 years old—was too old for the role. Ross went around Gordy and convinced executive producer Rob Cohen at Universal Pictures to arrange a deal where he would produce if Ross was cast as Dorothy. Gordy and Cohen agreed to the deal. Pauline Kael, a film critic, described Ross's efforts to get the film into production as "perhaps the strongest example of sheer will in film history."

After filmmaker John Badham learned that Ross was cast as Dorothy, he decided not to direct, and Cohen replaced him with Sidney Lumet. Of his decision not to direct The Wiz, Badham recalled telling Cohen that he thought Ross was "a wonderful singer. She's a terrific actress and a great dancer, but she's not this character. She's not the little six-year-old girl Dorothy in The Wizard of Oz." Lumet’s hiring was met with skepticism, as he was known as a dramatic filmmaker with no previous musical directing experience.

Though 20th Century Fox had financially backed the stage musical, they ended up exercising their first refusal rights to the film production, which gave Universal an opening to finance the film. Initially, Universal was so excited about the film's prospects that they did not set a budget for production.

Writing
Joel Schumacher's script was influenced by Werner Erhard's teachings and his Erhard Seminars Training ("est") movement, as both Schumacher and Ross were "very enamored of Werner Erhard". "Before I knew it," said Rob Cohen, "the movie was becoming an est-ian fable full of est buzzwords about knowing who you are and sharing and all that. I hated the script a lot. But it was hard to argue with [Ross] because she was recognizing in this script all of this stuff that she had worked out in est seminars." Schumacher spoke positively of the results of the est training, stating that he was "eternally grateful for learning that I was responsible for my life." However, he also complained that "everybody stayed exactly the way they were and went around spouting all this bull shit." Of est and Erhard references in the film itself, The Grove Book of Hollywood notes that the speech delivered by Glinda the Good Witch at the end of the film was "a litany of est-like platitudes", and the book also makes est comparisons to the song "Believe in Yourself". Although Schumacher had seen the Broadway play before writing the script, none of the play's writing was incorporated into the film, a fact that was noted and heavily criticized after release.

During production, Lumet felt that the finished film would be "an absolutely unique experience that nobody has ever witnessed before." When asked about any possible influence from MGM's popular 1939 film adaptation of The Wizard of Oz, Lumet stated that "there was nothing to be gained from [the 1939 film] other than to make certain we didn't use anything from it. They made a brilliant movie, and even though our concept is different – they're Kansas, we're New York; they're white, we're black, and the score and the books are totally different – we wanted to make sure that we never overlapped in any area."

Casting
Michael Jackson, a former Motown star and close friend of Ross, was cast as the Scarecrow. By the start of development, he and his brothers The Jacksons had left Motown for Epic Records after the release of their tenth album Moving Violation, though Jackson had yet to release a solo album since Forever, Michael. Cohen, head of Motown Productions, thought Jackson would be perfect for the role of the Scarecrow, and approached Gordy with the idea, who agreed, though Lumet was harder to convince. Lumet wanted Jimmie Walker, star of CBS-TV's Good Times, telling Cohen “Michael Jackson’s a Vegas act. The Jackson 5’s a Vegas act.” Quincy Jones was also skeptical of Jackson, but after Cohen arranged a meeting, flying 19-year-old Jackson to New York, Lumet and Jones saw the qualities that Cohen saw. Jackson's father, Joseph, was wary of the project and saw it as a threat to the Jacksons group cohesion. Cohen moved Michael and his sister La Toya into a Manhattan apartment, allowing him to be on his own for the first time. During production, he became a frequent visitor to New York's famous Studio 54. Jackson was dedicated to the Scarecrow role, and watched videotapes of gazelles, cheetahs and panthers in order to learn graceful movements for his part. The long hours of uncomfortable prosthetic makeup by Stan Winston did not bother him. During production, Jackson asked Quincy Jones who he would recommend as a producer on a yet unrecorded solo album project. Jones, impressed by Jackson's professionalism, talent and work ethic, offered to be producer of what became Off The Wall (1979), then later on the hugely successful albums Thriller (1982) and Bad (1987).

Ted Ross and Mabel King were brought in to reprise their respective roles from the stage musical, while Nipsey Russell was cast as the Tin Man. Lena Horne, mother-in-law to Lumet during the time of production, was cast as Glinda the Good Witch, and comedian Richard Pryor portrayed The Wiz. The film's choreographer was Louis Johnson.

Filming
Principal photography began on October 3, 1977 and concluded on December 29, 1977. It took place at Astoria Studios in Queens, New York. The decaying New York State Pavilion from the 1964 New York World's Fair was used as the set for Munchkinland, Astroland at Coney Island was used for the Tinman scene with The Cyclone as a backdrop, while the World Trade Center served as the Emerald City. The Emerald City scenes were elaborate, using 650 dancers, 385 crew members and 1,200 costumes. Costume designer Tony Walton enlisted the help of high fashion designers in New York City for the Emerald City sequence, and obtained exotic costumes and fabric from designers such as Oscar de la Renta and Norma Kamali. Albert Whitlock created the film's visual special effects, while Stan Winston served as the head makeup artist.

Songs and score
Quincy Jones served as musical supervisor and music producer. He later wrote that he initially did not want to work on the film, but did it as a favor to Lumet. The film marked Jones' first time working with Jackson, and Jones later produced three hit albums for Jackson: Off the Wall (1979), Thriller (1982) and Bad (1987). Jones recalled working with Jackson as one of his favorite experiences from The Wiz, and spoke of Jackson's dedication to his role, comparing his acting style to Sammy Davis, Jr. Jones had a brief cameo during the "Gold" segment of the Emerald City sequence, playing what looks like a fifty-foot grand piano.

Of the 28 numbers originally composed by Charlie Smalls and company, 17 were retained in full or in part for the film. “Tornado Ballet”, “I Was Born On The Day Before Yesterday”, “Kalidah Battle”, “Lion's Dream”, “Emerald City Ballet (Psst)”, “So You Wanted to Meet the Wizard”, the Act 2 Entr'acte, “Funky Monkeys”, “Who Do You Think You Are?”, “Y'all Got It”, and “A Rested Body” were cut.

Four new numbers were added, "Can I Go On?", the instrumental "Poppy Girls Theme", "Emerald City Sequence" and "Is This What Feeling Gets? (Dorothy's Theme)". “You Can't Win”, a song originally written for the musical’s Baltimore run that was cut after it was transferred to Broadway, was reincorporated.

Release and reception

Box office
The Wiz proved to be a commercial failure, as the $24 million production only earned $13.6 million at the box office. Though prerelease television broadcast rights had been sold to CBS for over $10 million, in the end, the film produced a net loss of $10.4 million for Motown and Universal. At the time, it was the most expensive film musical ever made. The film's failure steered Hollywood studios away from producing the all-black film projects that had become popular during the blaxploitation era of the early to mid-1970s for several years.

Home media
The film was first released on VHS home video in 1981 by MCA/Universal Home Video (with a reissue in 1992) and was first broadcast on television on CBS on October 11, 1980 then on May 5, 1984 (edited to 100 minutes), to capitalize on Jackson's massive popularity at the time. It continues to be broadcast periodically on Black-focused networks such as BET, TVOne, BET Her, and was the inaugural broadcast on the Bounce TV digital broadcast network. The Wiz is often broadcast on Thanksgiving Day (attributed to the opening scene of Dorothy's family gathered for a Thanksgiving dinner).

The film was released on DVD in 1999; a remastered version entitled The Wiz: 30th Anniversary Edition was released in 2008. Extras on both DVD releases include a 1978 featurette about the film's production and the original theatrical trailer. A Blu-ray version was released in 2010.

Critical reception
Critics panned The Wiz upon its October 1978 release. Many reviewers directed their criticism at Diana Ross, whom they believed was too old to play Dorothy. Most agreed that what had worked so successfully on stage simply did not translate well to the screen. Hischak's Through the Screen Door: What Happened to the Broadway Musical When It Went to Hollywood criticized "Joel Schumacher's cockamamy screenplay", and called "Believe in Yourself" the score's weakest song. He described Diana Ross's portrayal of Dorothy as: "cold, neurotic and oddly unattractive"; and noted that the film was "a critical and box office bust". In his work History of the American Cinema, Harpole characterized the film as "one of the decade's biggest failures", and, "the year's biggest musical flop". The Grove Book of Hollywood noted that "the picture finished off Diana Ross's screen career", as the film was Ross's final theatrical feature. In his 2004 book Blockbuster, Tom Shone referred to The Wiz as "expensive crud". In the book Mr. and Mrs. Hollywood, the author criticized the script, noting, "The Wiz was too scary for children, and too silly for adults." Ray Bolger, who played the Scarecrow in the 1939 film The Wizard of Oz, did not think highly of The Wiz, stating "The Wiz is overblown and will never have the universal appeal that the classic MGM musical has obtained."

The decision to hire Sidney Lumet, a dramatic filmmaker without any prior experience directing musicals, was criticized, with many critics believing his style was unsuited to the material or genre. The cinematography and production design, which replaced the fantastical Oz settings of the stage version with gritty urban cityscapes, were likewise criticized. Critics also questioned the decision to cut large portions of the original score, in some cases substituting original compositions that were regarded as inferior.

Jackson's performance as the Scarecrow was one of the few positively reviewed elements, with critics noting that Jackson possessed "genuine acting talent" and "provided the only genuinely memorable moments." Of the results of the film, Jackson stated: "I don't think it could have been any better, I really don't." In 1980, Jackson stated that his time working on The Wiz was "my greatest experience so far . . . I'll never forget that." Gene Siskel and Roger Ebert gave the film some of its most positive reviews on Sneak Previews. Siskel called it "superior musical theater," said Diana Ross was "superb," "terrific" and came across as "a real star" but had reservations about the film's "heavy message." Ebert praised other cast members and numerous technical aspects of the film, saying it was "fun" and in the "great tradition of the American musical." The film received another positive critique for its elaborate set design in the book American Jewish Filmmakers, which noted that it "features some of the most imaginative adaptations of New York locales since the glory days of the Astaire-Rogers films." In a 2004 review of the film, Christopher Null wrote positively of Ted Ross and Richard Pryor's performances. However, Null's overall review of the film was critical, and he wrote that other than the song "Ease on Down the Road", "the rest is an acid trip of bad dancing, garish sets, and a Joel Schumacher-scripted mess that runs 135 agonizing minutes." A 2005 piece by Hank Stuever in The Washington Post described the film as "a rather appreciable delight, even when it's a mess", and felt that the singing – especially Diana Ross's – was "a marvel".

The New York Times analyzed the film within a discussion of the genre of blaxploitation: "As the audience for blaxploitation dwindled, it seemed as if Car Wash and The Wiz might be the last gasp of what had been a steadily expanding black presence in mainstream filmmaking." The St. Petersburg Times noted, "Of course, it only took one flop like The Wiz (1978) to give Hollywood an excuse to retreat to safer (i.e., whiter) creative ground until John Singleton and Spike Lee came along. Yet, without blaxploitation there might not have been another generation of black filmmakers, no Denzel Washington or Angela Bassett, or they might have taken longer to emerge." The Boston Globe commented, "the term 'black film' should be struck from the critical vocabulary. To appreciate just how outmoded, deceptive and limiting it is, consider the following, all of which have been described as black films, . . ." and characterized The Wiz in a list that also featured 1970s films Shaft (1971), Blacula (1972), and Super Fly (1972).

Despite its lack of critical or commercial success in its original release, The Wiz became a cult classic, especially because it features Michael Jackson in his first starring theatrical film role. Jackson later starred in films such as Disney's Captain EO in 1986, the anthology film Moonwalker in 1988 and the posthumous documentary This Is It in 2009.

As of November 2021, The Wiz holds a 41% rating on Rotten Tomatoes from 34 reviews, with the consensus; "This workmanlike movie musical lacks the electricity of the stage version (and its cinematic inspiration), but it's bolstered by strong performances by Diana Ross and Michael Jackson." On Metacritic, the film has a score of 53 out of 100 based on 11 reviews, indicating "mixed or average reviews".

Accolades

See also
 Adaptations of The Wizard of Oz

References

External links
 
 
 
 
 

1978 films
1970s English-language films
1970s fantasy adventure films
1970s musical fantasy films
African-American musical films
American fantasy adventure films
American musical fantasy films
Blaxploitation films
Films about witchcraft
Films based on adaptations
Films based on children's books
Films based on multiple works
Films based on musicals
Films based on The Wizard of Oz
Films directed by Sidney Lumet
Films set in 1978
Films set in New York City
Films with screenplays by Joel Schumacher
MCA Records soundtracks
Motown Productions films
Universal Pictures films
African-American comedy films
1970s American films
Films about kidnapping
Films about dogs
Films about magic and magicians